Haplomunnidae is a family of crustaceans belonging to the order Isopoda.

Genera:
 Abyssaranea Wilson & Hessler, 1974
 Haplodendron Just, 2003
 Haplomunna Richardson, 1908
 Munella Bonnier, 1896
 Thylakogaster Wilson & Hessler, 1974

References

Isopoda